Faraoa ipo is a type of ball bread made in the Tuamotu archipelago of French Polynesia. The bread is made from flour leavened with yeast, with coconut, coconut milk, sugar and salt added. The dough is then shaped into a ball and cooked in coconut water.

It can also be cooked in a ahima'a (earth oven), wrapped in banana leaves.

Variants 
Faraoa means bread in the local language, coming from farine (flour). There are many varieties of bread in Polynesia, mainly made from coconut:
 Faraoa uto, bread made with flour mixed with crushed uto (coconut germ).
 Faraoa omoto bread made with flour mixed with coconut ('omoto)
 Faraoa 'eu, type of sweet bread
 Faraoa farai pani, pancake
 Faraoa ha'ari, bread with coconut milk
 Faraoa hopue, bread
 Faraoa mamahu, sweet bread cooked in banana leaves
 Faraoa mape, balls of flour mixed with coconut water and baked

References 

French Polynesian cuisine
French Polynesian breads
Foods containing coconut